Simo or SIMO may refer to:

People 
 Simo (given name), a given name
 Simo (surname), a surname
 Simone "Simo" Teti, of Paris & Simo
 Simo (footballer) (Wassim Keddari Boulif), Spanish footballer nicknamed Simo

Other uses
 SIMO (band), an American rock band formed in 2010
 Simo (society), a secret society in West Africa
 Simo (weevil), a beetle genus in the tribe Peritelini
 Simo, Finland, a municipality of Finland
 SIMO TCI (Salón Internacional de Mobiliario de Oficina / Tecnologías de la Comunicación e Información), an annual computer trade fair held in Spain from 1961 to 2013.
 Simo (Single input, multiple outputs), a characterization of control systems in system analysis
 Silicon Motion, a semiconductor and solid-state drive manufacturer traded as SIMO

See also 
 
 Simon (given name)
 Samo (disambiguation)